The Lower Price Hill Community School, Inc., is an adult education school in the  Lower Price Hill neighborhood of Cincinnati, Ohio. Founded in 1971, it is housed in the former school building of 
St. Michael the Archangel Church.  The school was originally focused on assisting the large population of Urban Appalachians in the neighborhood to obtain high school credentials through the GED exam.  In 1983 it began to offer college-level classes as well through a relationship with Xavier University.  The success of the program led to other proposed adult education facilities in similar neighborhoods.  By 2002 the school had served more than 5,000 students. 

The school currently offers college course through Cincinnati State Technical and Community College as well as its GED and ESL programs.  It provides free tuition and childcare services to students who attend classes.

References

External links 
Lower Price Hill Community School Website

Adult education in the United States
Appalachian culture in Cincinnati
Education in Cincinnati
Educational institutions established in 1971